Angela's Christmas is a 2017 Irish-Canadian animation film directed by Damien O'Connor, written by Will Collins and Damien O'Connor and starring the Oscar nominees Ruth Negga in the role of Angela’s mother, and Lucy O'Connell as Angela. The plot is based on the children's story from Pulitzer Prize winning Irish author Frank McCourt, and is set in Limerick, Ireland in the 1910s. The story revolves around Angela's (Lucy O'Connell) desire to make sure everyone is having a great Christmas. The film's cast and production team received a number of nominations at the 46th Daytime Emmy Awards and 2018 Emile Awards.

Production
Angela's Christmas was executive produced by Frank McCourt's widow Ellen McCourt. This was Frank McCourt's only children's story, from a story his mother Angela told him and his brother Malachy McCourt, as a child. Malachy McCourt provides the narration. Dolores O'Riordan contributed to the soundtrack.

The film was produced by the Irish production studio Brown Bag Films, with distribution rights help by the Canadian company 9 Story Distribution International.

Main cast 
 Malachy McCourt as Narrator
 Ruth Negga as Mother
 Caitríona Balfe as Dorothy's Mother
 Vivian Drew as Tom
 Anya O'Connor as Aggie
 Brendan Mullins as Pat
 Lucy O'Connell as Angela
 Brian Gleeson as Guard
 Pat Kinevane as Father Creagh / Mr. King
 Don Wycherley as Accordion Player

Release
The film was released on 30 November 2018 on Netflix streaming.

In October 2020, it was announced that a sequel titled Angela's Christmas Wish would be released on Netflix on 1 December 2020.

References

External links 
 
 
 

2017 films
2010s English-language films
Irish animated films
Canadian children's animated films
Canadian Christmas films
2010s Canadian films
Animated films about children